Icelita monela is a species of moth of the family Tortricidae. It is found on the Marshall Islands, the southern Mariana Islands, the eastern Caroline Islands and in New Caledonia and Australia, where it has been recorded from Queensland.

References

Moths described in 1976
Eucosmini